Allston Street station is a light rail station on the MBTA Green Line B branch, located between the westbound travel lanes and frontage road of Commonwealth Avenue at Allston Street in Allston, Boston, Massachusetts. The station is not accessible. It has two side platforms, located on the near sides of the Allston Street grade crossing, to serve the line's two tracks.

History
Streetcar service began when the section from Packards Corner to Chestnut Hill Avenue opened on May 26, 1900, connecting previously opened trackage to the east and west. Until 1983, the station had narrow platforms; the inbound platform had only a curb to separate passengers from the southbound travel lanes. While the line was shut down for track replacement from July 30 to September 10, 1983, the station was rebuilt with low walls to separate passengers from traffic.

References

External links

MBTA - Allston Street
Station from Google Maps Street View

Green Line (MBTA) stations
Railway stations in Boston
Railway stations in the United States opened in 1900